The Japan PGA Senior Championship is one of the major events on the Japan Senior Tour. It was first played in 1962. The 2007 prize money was ¥50,000,000.

Winners
this list is incomplete
2021 Mitsuhiro Tateyama
2020 Masayoshi Nakayama
2019 Hidezumi Shirakata
2018 Tsuyoshi Yoneyama
2017 Lu Chien-soon
2016 Prayad Marksaeng
2015 Kiyoshi Murota
2014 Naomichi Ozaki
2013 Tsukasa Watanabe
2012 Kiyoshi Murota
2011 Kim Jong-duck
2010 Hideki Kase
2009 Kiyoshi Murota
2008 Tsukasa Watanabe
2007 Tateo Ozaki
2006 Tsuneyuki Nakajima
2005 Kiyoshi Murota
2004 Takaaki Fukuzawa
2003 Noboru Fujiike
2002 Chen Tze-ming
2001 Yasuhiro Miyamoto
2000 Katsunari Takahashi
1999 Tadami Ueno
1998 Seiichi Kanai
1997 Ichiro Teramoto
1996 Koji Nakajima
1995 Teruo Sugihara
1994 Shigeru Uchida
1993 Shigeru Uchida
1992 Teruo Sugihara
1991  Hiroshi Ishii
1990 Seiichi Kanai
1989 Teruo Sugihara
1988 Chi-Chi Rodríguez
1987 Kesahiko Uchida
1986 Tadashi Kitta
1985 
1984 Hsieh Yung-yo
1983 
1982 Seiichi Sato
1981 Chen Ching-Po
1980 Yoshimasa Fujii
1979 Yoshimasa Fujii
1978 Tetsuo Ishii
1977 Tomoo Ishii
1976 Torakichi Nakamura
1975 Haruyoshi Kobari
1974 Michio Ishii
1973 Torakichi Nakamura
1972 Toichiro Toda
1971 Haruyoshi Kobari
1970 Toichiro Toda
1969 Toichiro Toda
1968 Toichiro Toda
1967 Toichiro Toda
1966 Toichiro Toda
1965
1964 
1963
1962 Kinichi Teramoto

External links
Japan PGA home page 

Golf tournaments in Japan